Batya ( — a dad) is a 2021 Russian comedy film directed by Dmitry Yefimovich. It was released to theaters on February 23, 2021 by Central Partnership.

Plot 
The film tells about a man's journey to his stern dad, who raised him the way it was customary in the USSR.

Cast 
жчь

References 

2021 films
2020s Russian-language films
Russian comedy films
2021 comedy films